Kyrkjenuten is a mountain in the municipality of Sauda in Rogaland county, Norway.

References

Mountains of Rogaland
Sauda